Anna Banti (born Lucia Lopresti; 27 June 1895 – 2 September 1985) was an Italian writer, art historian, critic, and translator.

Life and works 
Banti was born in Florence. In her youth she spent time in Rome, attending the University of Rome and Bologna before returning permanently to Florence. At the university, she received a degree in art history. Her pseudonym derived from "an exceptionally beautiful woman" she knew in her youth. She married art critic Roberto Longhi and in 1950 they founded and edited the bi-monthly art magazine Paragone. She did several stories and works over the next decades, but she would become best known for a historical novel concerning artist Artemisia Gentileschi. One newspaper even headlined their report of Banti's death by saying Addio, Artemisia. This work revived interest in Artemisia's work and life.

Banti's autobiographical work, Un Grido Lacerante, was published in 1981 and won the Antonio Feltrinelli prize. As well as being a successful author, Banti is recognized as a literary, cinematic, and art critic.  After the death of Longhi in 1970, she replaced him as the editor of Paragone.

Banti died on 2 September 1985 in Massa, and is buried at Cimitero degli Allori in Florence.

Selected filmography
 Yes, Madam (1942)

Awards 
1972 Bagutta Prize

References 

1895 births
1985 deaths
Writers from Florence
Italian art historians
Italian art critics
Italian women art critics
Italian magazine editors
Italian women novelists
Women art historians
20th-century Italian novelists
20th-century Italian women writers
20th-century translators
Literary translators
Italian women editors
Women magazine editors